Marian Blank Horn (born 1943) is a senior judge of the United States Court of Federal Claims.

Early life, education, and career

Born in New York City, Horn attended the Fieldston School and received a Bachelor of Arts degree from Barnard College, Columbia University, and a Juris Doctor from the Fordham University School of Law, in 1969. She was an assistant district attorney in Bronx County, New York, and then entered private practice as a litigator with the firm of Arent, Fox, Kintner, Plotkin and Kahn.

From 1973 to 1975, Horn was a project manager for a Study of Alternatives to Conventional Criminal Adjudication, and an adjunct professor at American University's Washington College of Law. She then joined the Office of General Counsel for the Department of Energy/Federal Energy Administration, and in 1979 became the Office's deputy assistant general counsel for Financial Incentives, Office of General Counsel.

From 1981 to 1986, she worked in the United States Department of the Interior, where she assisted the Associate Solicitor and helped administer the Surface Mining Control and Reclamation Act of 1977. In 1985, Horn was promoted to principal deputy solicitor, where she supervised all the Regional and Field Offices of the Solicitor's Office in the Department and acted as the chief lawyer to the Secretary and Under Secretary of the Department of the Interior.

Federal judicial service
In 1986, President Ronald Reagan appointed Horn as judge of the United States Court of Federal Claims. She was reappointed by President George W. Bush in 2003 and assumed senior status on March 9, 2018.

Personal life
Judge Horn is the daughter of Werner and Mady Blank. Her father was a German judge removed from the bench in Berlin by the Nazis for being Jewish. She was married to Robert J. Horn, a lawyer who was the founding chair of the Republican National Lawyers Association, until his death in February 2020. They have three daughters.

References

External links 
 
 Biography of Marian Blank Horn from the United States Court of Federal Claims

|-

1943 births
Living people
20th-century American judges
21st-century American judges
American women lawyers
Barnard College alumni
Fordham University School of Law alumni
Judges of the United States Court of Federal Claims
New York (state) lawyers
United States Article I federal judges appointed by George W. Bush
United States Article I federal judges appointed by Ronald Reagan
Washington College of Law faculty
20th-century American women judges
21st-century American women judges